Mossie Dowling (born 1946) is a former Irish sportsperson.  He played hurling with his local club Kilmallock and with the Limerick senior intra-county team in the 1970s.

References

Living people
Kilmallock hurlers
Limerick inter-county hurlers
All-Ireland Senior Hurling Championship winners
1946 births